Barnabas Mturi Mwangi is a Kenyan politician. He belongs to Sisi Kwa Sisi and was elected to represent the Kiharu Constituency in the National Assembly of Kenya since the 2007 Kenyan parliamentary election.

References

Living people
Year of birth missing (living people)
Members of the National Assembly (Kenya)
Sisi Kwa Sisi politicians
Place of birth missing (living people)